Gamochaeta stachydifolia is a species of flowering plant in the family Asteraceae. It is native to South America (Chile, Argentina, Brazil, Uruguay) and naturalized in parts of California.

The plant forms many small flower heads in elongated arrays. Each head contains 2–4 yellow disc flowers but no ray flowers.

References

stachydifolia
Flora of South America
Plants described in 1788
Taxa named by Ángel Lulio Cabrera